KWIS (88.3 FM) is a radio station licensed to serve the community of Plummer, Idaho. The station is owned by the Coeur d'Alene Tribe, and airs a community radio format.

The station was assigned the KWIS call letters by the Federal Communications Commission on December 29, 2008.

References

External links
 Official Website
 

WIS
Radio stations established in 2011
2011 establishments in Idaho
Community radio stations in the United States
Benewah County, Idaho
Coeur d'Alene tribe